Tamachi (also Romanized as Ţamachī and Tamchī; also known as Ţameh Chī) is a village in Mofatteh Rural District, in the Central District of Famenin County, Hamadan Province, Iran. At the 2006 census, its population was 390, in 85 families.

References 

Populated places in Famenin County